WBXI is a set of call letters used for the following television stations:
WBXI-CD, Indianapolis, IN
WBXI, a WB 100+ Station Group affiliate in Binghamton, NY, which is predecessor of WBNG-TV's .2 subchannel